Mike Racanelli is an American retired gymnast.  His specialty was floor exercise, where he had an expressive style.

College career
Racanelli competed for Ohio State University, where he was a 10-time All-American.  His coach at OSU was Peter Kormann, who had medalled in the 1976 Olympics.  In 1990, Racanelli won the Nissen Award, the "Heisman" of gymnastics, as well as the Big Ten Medal of Honor.  At the 1990 NCAA championships, Racanelli won gold in the all around and floor exercise.  Also, he qualified to finals on all 6 apparatus that year, the only athlete to do so.  Racanelli is a member of Ohio State's  Men's Varsity "O" Hall of Fame.

Elite career
In 1989 Racanelli won gold on the floor exercise at the U.S. National Championships and bronze in the all-around.  That year, he was also a member of the U.S. World Championships team.

In 1990, Racanelli won floor exercise at the Chunichi Cup, becoming the first American since 1984 to win an event gold.  Later that year, he competed at the U.S. Olympic Cup.

In 1991, Racanelli, recovering from a shoulder injury, finished only 11th all-around at Nationals, but he won gold on floor.  Later that year, he won floor gold at the World University Games.  In August, he won another floor gold, at the Pan American Games.

In 1992, Racanelli did not participate in Nationals or Olympic Trials.

In 1995, Racanelli finished 16th overall at Nationals.

In 1996, at Nationals, Racanelli finished fourth on pommel horse and 6th on vault. His all-around score was 17th.  Only the top 14 were invited to Olympic Trials.

References

Ohio State Buckeyes men's gymnasts
American gymnasts
Living people
Year of birth missing (living people)
Pan American Games medalists in gymnastics
Pan American Games silver medalists for the United States
Gymnasts at the 1991 Pan American Games
Medalists at the 1991 Pan American Games